Hermann Schild (16 February 1913 – 9 April 2006) was a German racing cyclist. He rode in the 1938 Tour de France, and he won the German National Road Race in 1954.

References

External links
 

1913 births
2006 deaths
German male cyclists
Sportspeople from Guben
German cycling road race champions
People from the Province of Brandenburg
Cyclists from Brandenburg
20th-century German people